Lipinia rouxi, also known as Roux's lipinia, is a species of skink. It is endemic to New Ireland, in the Bismarck Archipelago of Papua New Guinea.

References

Lipinia
Reptiles of Papua New Guinea
Endemic fauna of Papua New Guinea
Bismarck Archipelago
Reptiles described in 1934
Taxa named by Heini Hediger
Skinks of New Guinea